JWP may refer to:
 IUPAC/IUPAP Joint Working Party, a group that names new chemical elements
 Jake White Project, an American band
 JadeWeserPort, a port in northern Germany
 James Ward-Prowse (born 1994), English footballer
 Jamhoori Wattan Party, a Pakistani political party based in Balochistan province
 Japanese Word Processor, the predecessor to JWPce
 John Wayne Parr (born 1976), Australian boxer and kickboxer
 JWP Joshi Puroresu, a Japanese professional wrestling promotion
JWP Joint Women's Programme, an  organisation that works for women empowerment and for children education